The 1945 Tennessee Volunteers (variously Tennessee, UT, or the Vols) represented the University of Tennessee in the 1945 college football season. Playing as a member of the Southeastern Conference (SEC), the team was led by head coach John Barnhill, in his fourth year, and played their home games at Shields–Watkins Field in Knoxville, Tennessee. They finished the season with a record of eight wins and one loss (8–1 overall, 3–1 in the SEC).

Schedule

Team players drafted into the NFL

References:

References

Tennessee
Tennessee Volunteers football seasons
Tennessee Volunteers football